Ivashkivtsi may refer to the following places in Ukraine:

Ivashkivtsi, Khmelnytskyi Raion, village in Khmelnytskyi Raion, Khmelnytskyi Oblast
Ivashkivtsi, Nova Ushytsia Raion, village in Nova Ushytsia Raion, Khmelnytskyi Oblast
Ivashkivtsi, Lviv Oblast, village in Turka Raion, Lviv Oblast
Ivashkivtsi, Ternopil Oblast, village in Zbarazh Raion, Ternopil Oblast
Ivashkivtsi, Vinnytsia Oblast, village in Sharhorod Raion, Vinnytsia Oblast